Wing Commander Allan Runciman Brown was an Australian World War I flying ace credited with five aerial victories. During World War II, he was a Wing Commander for the Royal Australian Air Force.

He was born on 24 April 1895, and in civilian life, Brown was a draper in Launceston, Australia.

Brown originally served as an artillery officer, before becoming a pilot. He was assigned to No. 68 Squadron RFC/1 Squadron AFC in Egypt. There he was teamed with Lieutenant Garfield Finlay as his observer/gunner on Bristol F2b Fighters; Brown's gunner for four of his five triumphs was Finlay. Brown's modus operandi was to force enemy planes into landing, and then destroy them on the ground with bombs and bullets. He scored his first win on 3 May 1918 near Suweilah, and his last one on 22 August 1918 at Ramleh. He also carried out successful ground attacks on cavalry and anti-aircraft guns.

Honours and awards
Distinguished Flying Cross (DFC):

Notes

References
 
 

1895 births
1964 deaths
Royal Flying Corps officers
Royal Australian Air Force officers
Australian World War I flying aces
Recipients of the Distinguished Flying Cross (United Kingdom)
Royal Air Force officers
British Army personnel of World War I
Royal Air Force personnel of World War I
Royal Australian Air Force personnel of World War II